Geovane Magno Cândido Silveira (born 14 April 1994), known simply as Geovane Magno, is a Brazilian professional footballer who plays as a midfielder or forward for V.League 1 club Viettel.

References

1994 births
Living people
Brazilian footballers
Association football midfielders
Association football forwards
V.League 1 players
Sociedade Esportiva Matonense players
São Carlos Futebol Clube players
Maringá Futebol Clube players
Saigon FC players
Hanoi FC players
Brazilian expatriate footballers
Brazilian expatriate sportspeople in Vietnam
Expatriate footballers in Vietnam